Liolaemus septentrionalis, the painted tree iguana, is a species of lizard in the family Liolaemidae. It is native to Chile.

References

septentrionalis
Reptiles described in 2005
Reptiles of Chile
Endemic fauna of Chile